Hovey may refer to:


People
 Hovey (surname), a list of people
 Hovey E. Copley (1869–1946), American politician
 Hovey Everett (died 1861), owner of Dr. Hovey Everett House, Chemung, New York, United States

Geography
 Hovey, Indiana, United States, an unincorporated community
 Hovey Township, Armstrong County, Pennsylvania, United States
 Hovey Lake, a body of water near Mount Vernon, Indiana, United States - see Hovey Lake Fish and Wildlife Area
 Hovey Channel, a feature of the Permian Basin (North America)

Military uses
 Camp Hovey, a United States Army military base in Dongducheon, Gyeonggi Province, South Korea
 Fort Hovey (Fort Curtis), an American Civil War fort in Missouri
 , a World War II United States Navy destroyer

Other uses
 Hovey Field, a stadium in Richmond, Virginia, United States

See also
 , a merchant ship sunk by Japanese submarine I-26 during World War II

English-language masculine given names